Paolo (Pablo) Rosich (1780 – after 1832) was a Spanish-born opera singer and librettist widely known by the Italianized version of his first name. A skilled comic actor, he performed leading basso buffo roles in many Italian opera houses as well as in Lisbon, London, Madrid and New York. Rosich created the roles of Taddeo in Gioachino Rossini's L'italiana in Algeri and Buralicchio in Rossini's L'equivoco stravagante and also wrote the librettos for two operas by Manuel García: L'amante astuto and La figlia dell' aria.

Roles created
Buralicchio in Rossini's L'equivoco stravagante, Teatro del Corso, Bologna, 26 October 1811
Taddeo in Rossini's L'italiana in Algeri, Teatro San Benedetto, Venice, 22 May 1813
Oranteo in Coccia's La donna selvaggia, Teatro San Benedetto, Venice, 24 June 1813
Grood ("il Lupo d'Ostenda") in Nicola Vaccai's Il lupo d'Ostenda, ossia L'innocenza salvata dalla colpa, Teatro San Benedetto, Venice, 17 June 1818.
Wibrac in Coccia's La festa della rosa, Theatro de São Carlos, Lisbon, 13 August 1821
Anacleto in García's L'amante astuto, Park Theatre, New York, 17 December 1825
Timoteo in García's La figlia dell'aria, Park Theatre, New York, 25 April 1826

References

External links
Rosich's libretto for L'amante astuto, published by E. M. Murden in New York, 1825
Rosich's libretto for La figlia dell'aria, published by E. M. Murden in New York, 1826

Operatic basses
Opera singers from Catalonia
19th-century Spanish male opera singers
Spanish opera librettists
1780 births
19th-century deaths